The governor of Primorsky Krai heads the executive branch of Primorsky Krai, a federal subject of Russia, situated in the Far Eastern region of the country. The governor is elected by direct popular vote for the term of five years.

List of officeholders

References 

Politics of Primorsky Krai
 
Primorsky Krai